The 1984 Soviet Union tornado outbreak, also known as the 1984 Ivanovo tornado outbreak, was one of only three disastrous tornado outbreaks in modern Russian history (one of the others being the 1904 Moscow tornado) and the third-deadliest tornado outbreak in European history. Occurring on June 9, 1984, the outbreak struck the Ivanovo and Yaroslavl regions north of Moscow, an area over 400,000 km2. At least two of the eleven known tornadoes were violent events, equal to F4 or higher in intensity on the Fujita scale, based upon observed damages. Another tornado, assessed to have been at least F4, occurred at Kostroma. In all, the entire tornado outbreak killed at least 69 people (though the exact death toll is unknown) and injured 804.

Meteorological synopsis 
On June 8, 1984, a negatively tilted trough caused an extratropical low pressure area to form over the coast of the Socialist Republic of Romania (now non-Communist Romania). By 1800 UTC, developing thunderstorms over the Ukrainian SSR spread overnight into the Russian SFSR. Between 00 and 12 UTC on June 9, the strengthening low pressure area moved north-northeast over the northwestern Russian SFSR before undergoing occlusion. In the meantime, a strong cold front rapidly advanced along a line extending south from the surface low, then south of Minsk in the Byelorussian SSR (now Belarus), to near Bucharest. This front separated the drier air mass to the north from the warm, moist air mass near the Black Sea, and strong wind speeds near ground level caused vertical mixing. Therefore, dew points actually dropped before the first tornadoes formed, but nevertheless several factors overcame the lower dew points to produce tornadoes. Among these were a strong upper-level jet stream, clear skies causing daytime heating and instability, strong synoptic-scale lifting leading to ascension of updrafts, and high adiabatic lapse rates promoting thunderstorm development. All these factors combined to produce severe weather near Moscow. The tornadoes occurred in this region because an unstable and moist air mass, supported by warm sea surface temperatures over the Black Sea, had been in place four days before the outbreak began. The unusually strong intensity of the trough in the region on June 8–9, with a 500-millibar geopotential height measured at about 2.7 standard deviations below normal, also favored an intense tornado outbreak.

Tornadoes

June 9 event

Ivanovo/Lunyovo 

A large, long-tracked, and devastating tornado, considered one of the worst in Russian history, destroyed numerous towns and villages along its path. Rated F4 on the Fujita scale, the 1130 metres tornado killed at least 69 people and injured more than 130 others. About 1,180 homes were also damaged, destroyed or leveled by the tornado. Some estimates indicate up to 95 deaths or even more, with some sources suggesting 400 deaths in the outbreak were all related to the Ivanovo tornado. It was previously rated as an F5, however, recent reanalysis has lowered the rating.

Near Ivanovo, the tornado snapped or bent pine, spruce, and birch trees about – from ground level. ESWD mentions that the tornado destroyed factory areas.

Near the Volga River, the tornado ripped up trees by their roots and destroyed many small huts. Steel water containers capable of holding  of water were carried  in the air and transported  from their original site. The F4 tornado tracked for —though some sources suggest only —before dissipating near Lunyovo in Yaroslavl Oblast. It caused at least 92 deaths, though many others likely went unreported.

Kostroma/Lyubim 

According to Russian researchers writing in the 1980s, this tornado was either the same as the Ivanovo tornado or a member of the Ivanovo tornado family; if the latter, it may indicate that the Ivanovo tornado was in fact two separate tornadoes spawned by the same thunderstorm. However, recent research indicates that the Ivanovo storm was not the same as the one that produced the Kostroma tornado. Numerous trees were thrown long distances by the tornado. A crane weighing  was knocked over, and numerous other structures were damaged. The severity of the damage was rated F4; however, there are indications that the tornado may have attained F5 intensity.

See also 
 List of European tornadoes and tornado outbreaks
 2022 Russian and Ukrainian tornado outbreak

References

External links 
 http://islandnet.com/~see/weather/storm/tornadoes-europe.htm 

Tornadoes in Russia
Tornadoes of 1984
Yaroslavl tornado
Natural disasters in the Soviet Union
Tornadoes in Europe
June 1984 events in Europe
1984 disasters in Russia